Franz Josef Ruprecht (1 November 1814 – 4 April 1870) was an Austrian-born physician and botanist active in the Russian Empire, where he was known as Frants Ivanovič Ruprekht.

He was born in Freiburg im Breisgau, and grew up in Prague, where he studied, and graduated as Doctor of Medicine in 1836. After a short stint in medical practice in Prague, he was appointed curator of the herbarium of the Russian Academy of Sciences in Saint Petersburg in 1839, then assistant director of the Saint Petersburg Botanical Garden between 1851 and 1855, and professor of botany in 1855 at the University of Saint Petersburg. He died in Saint Petersburg in 1870.

He described many new plants collected in the Russian Far East, including Alaska, then under Russian rule; examples include Adiantum aleuticum, Lonicera maackii, and Phellodendron amurense.

The genus Ruprechtia is named after him.

Publications 
 Ruprecht, F. J. Symbolae ad historiam et geographiam plantarum Rossicarum, St. Petersburg in 1846 
 Ruprecht, F. J. Flora Caucasi, P. 1. St. Pétersbourg 1869
 Postels, A., Ruprecht, F.J. Illustrationes algarum, Weinheim, J. Cramer 1963
 Ruprecht, F. J. Flora ingrica (flora of the Leningrad region).

References 

 Extensive biography on Allg. Deutsche Biographie 
Fedotova A.A. The Origins of the Russian Chernozem Soil (Black Earth): Franz Joseph Ruprecht's ‘Geo-Botanical Researches into the Chernozem’ of 1866]], Environment and History, 16 (2010): 271–293

19th-century Austrian botanists
19th-century botanists from the Russian Empire
1814 births
1870 deaths
Demidov Prize laureates
Full members of the Saint Petersburg Academy of Sciences
Academic staff of Saint Petersburg State University
Scientists from Prague
Austrian Empire emigrants to the Russian Empire
German Bohemian people
Physicians from Prague